Louise, Princess Royal and Duchess of Fife  (Louise Victoria Alexandra Dagmar; 20 February 1867 – 4 January 1931) was the third child and eldest daughter of King Edward VII and Queen Alexandra of the United Kingdom; she was a younger sister of King George V. Louise was given the title of Princess Royal in 1905. Known for her shy and quiet personality, Louise remained a low-key member of the royal family throughout her life.

Early life

Louise was born on 20 February 1867 at Marlborough House, the London residence of her parents, the Prince and Princess of Wales. Louise's father was the eldest son of Queen Victoria and Prince Albert. Her mother was the eldest daughter of Christian IX and Queen Louise of Denmark. From birth, as the granddaughter of the British monarch, she had the title Her Royal Highness Princess Louise of Wales. She spent much of her childhood at Sandringham House in Norfolk. She was baptised at Marlborough House on 10 May 1867 by Charles Longley, Archbishop of Canterbury. Like her sisters Victoria and Maud, she was educated under the supervision of tutors. She occasionally spent the summer in Denmark, her mother's homeland. In her youth, Louise was described as a very withdrawn girl.

Louise and her sisters, Victoria and Maud, were bridesmaids at the wedding of their paternal aunt Princess Beatrice to Prince Henry of Battenberg in 1885.

Marriage and children

Despite her mother's attempts to keep her daughters unmarried and by her side, on Saturday 27 July 1889, Louise married Alexander Duff, 6th Earl Fife, who was eighteen years her senior, at the Private Chapel in Buckingham Palace with the Archbishop of Canterbury officiating at the service. Her bridesmaids were Princesses Maud and Victoria of Wales, Victoria Mary of Teck, Marie Louise and Helena Victoria of Schleswig-Holstein and the Countesses Feodora, Helena and Valda Gleichen. Two days after the wedding, Queen Victoria created him Duke of Fife and Marquess of Macduff in the Peerage of the United Kingdom. The letters patent creating this dukedom contained the standard remainder to heirs male of the body lawfully begotten. After the birth of their two daughters, on 24 April 1900, Queen Victoria signed letters patent creating a second Dukedom of Fife, along with the Earldom of Macduff in the Peerage of the United Kingdom with a special remainder: in default of a male heir, these peerages would pass to the daughters of the 1st Duke, and then to their male descendants.

The Duke and Duchess of Fife had three children:

 Alastair Duff, Marquess of Macduff (stillborn 16 June 1890)
 Princess Alexandra, 2nd Duchess of Fife (17 May 1891 – 26 February 1959); married her first cousin once removed Prince Arthur of Connaught (13 January 1883 – 12 September 1938), and had issue.
 Princess Maud (3 April 1893 – 14 December 1945); married Charles Carnegie, 11th Earl of Southesk, and had issue.

The couple made their home at Mar Lodge, a sporting lodge built for them by Alexander Marshall Mackenzie.

Princess Royal

On 9 November 1905, Edward VII created Louise the Princess Royal, the highest honour bestowed on a female member of the royal family. At the same time, the King declared that the two daughters of the Princess Royal would be styled as princesses, with the style and attribute of "Highness" and with precedence immediately after all members of the royal family bearing the style of "Royal Highness".

In December 1911, while sailing aboard SS Delhi to Egypt, the Princess Royal and her family were shipwrecked off the coast of Morocco. Although they were otherwise unharmed, the Duke of Fife fell ill with pleurisy, probably contracted as a result of the shipwreck. He died at Assuan, Egypt, in January 1912, and Princess Alexandra succeeded to his dukedom, becoming Duchess of Fife in her own right.

Later life and death

After the death of her husband, Louise led a reclusive life. Sometimes she accompanied her mother and her sister Victoria to public events. In the years leading up to her death Louise suffered from heart disease. In October 1929 at Mar Lodge she was taken ill with gastric haemorrhage and was brought back to London. Louise died in her sleep 15 months later on the afternoon on 4 January 1931, a month before her 64th birthday, at her home at 15 Portman Square London, with her two daughters Alexandra and Maud at her bedside. She was buried in St. George's Chapel, Windsor Castle. Her remains were later removed to the Private Chapel, Mar Lodge, Braemar, Aberdeenshire. Her will was sealed and her estate was valued at £46,383 (or £2.2 million in 2022 when adjusted for inflation).

Honours and arms
 1885: Royal Order of Victoria and Albert
 1887: Imperial Order of the Crown of India
 1929: Dame Grand Cross of the Venerable Order of St John of Jerusalem (GCStJ)
 1888–1929:  Lady of the Venerable Order of St John of Jerusalem (LJStJ)

Honorary military appointments 
 1911: Lady Sponsor of HMS Princess Royal
 1914: Colonel-in-chief of the 7th Dragoon Guards
 1922: Colonel-in-chief of the 4th/7th Royal Dragoon Guards

Arms
Upon her marriage, Louise was granted a coat of arms, being the Royal Arms of the United Kingdom with an inescutcheon for Saxony, all differenced with a label argent of five points, the outer pair and centre bearing crosses gules, and the inner pair bearing thistles proper. The inescutcheon was dropped by royal warrant in 1917.

Ancestors

References

Bibliography
 
 

1867 births
1931 deaths
19th-century British people
20th-century British people
19th-century British women
20th-century British women
British people of Danish descent
British princesses
Princesses Royal
Women of the Victorian era
House of Saxe-Coburg and Gotha (United Kingdom)
Companions of the Order of the Crown of India
Dames Grand Cross of the Order of St John
Ladies of the Royal Order of Victoria and Albert
Fife
People from Westminster
Children of Edward VII
Daughters of emperors
Royal reburials
Daughters of kings